The 2013 Toray Pan Pacific Open was a women's tennis tournament played on outdoor hard courts. It was the 30th edition of the Toray Pan Pacific Open, and part of the Premier Series of the 2013 WTA Tour. It took place at the Ariake Coliseum in Tokyo, Japan, from September 22 through 28, 2013. Petra Kvitová won the singles title.

Points and prize money

Point distribution

Prize money

* per team

Singles main-draw entrants

Seeds

 1 Rankings are as of September 16, 2013

Other entrants
The following players received wildcards into the singles main draw:
  Belinda Bencic 
  Misaki Doi 
  Kurumi Nara

The following players received entry from the qualifying draw:
  Casey Dellacqua 
  Daria Gavrilova 
  Polona Hercog 
  Paula Ormaechea 
  Risa Ozaki 
  Anastasia Rodionova
  María Teresa Torró Flor 
  Barbora Záhlavová-Strýcová

Withdrawals
Before the tournament
  Marion Bartoli (retirement from tennis)
  Jamie Hampton (left ankle injury)
  Maria Kirilenko
  Sabine Lisicki (fever)
  Ekaterina Makarova
  Nadia Petrova (left hip injury)
  Maria Sharapova (right shoulder injury)
  Serena Williams (fatigue)

Retirements
  Anastasia Pavlyuchenkova (illness)
  Anastasia Rodionova (left abdominal injury)

Doubles main-draw entrants

Seeds

1 Rankings are as of September 16, 2013

Other entrants
The following pairs received wildcards into the doubles main draw:
  Dominika Cibulková /  Marina Erakovic
  Kimiko Date-Krumm  /  Arantxa Parra Santonja
  Kirsten Flipkens /  Petra Kvitová

The following pair received entry as alternates:
  Shuko Aoyama /  Megan Moulton-Levy

Withdrawals
Before the tournament
  Martina Hingis (personal reasons)
  Anastasia Pavlyuchenkova (illness)

Champions

Singles

 Petra Kvitová def.  Angelique Kerber 6–2, 0–6, 6–3

Doubles

 Cara Black /  Sania Mirza def. Chan Hao-ching /  Liezel Huber 4–6, 6–0, [11–9]

References

External links
Official website

Toray Pan Pacific Open
Pan Pacific Open
Toray Pan Pacific Open
Toray Pan Pacific Open
Toray Pan Pacific Open